Everything You Always Wanted to Know About Sex* (*But Were Afraid to Ask) is a book (1969, updated 1999) by California psychiatrist David Reuben. It was one of the first sex manuals that entered mainstream culture in the 1960s, and had a profound effect on sex education and in liberalizing attitudes towards sex. It was "among the top 20 all-time best sellers of the 20th century in the United States".

History
The book was a Number 1 best-seller in 51 countries and reached more than 100 million readers. In 1972, it was parodied by Woody Allen in the comedy film of the same name and received a favorable response from movie critics.

The book had a significant impact. It was favorably reviewed by The New York Times and Life Magazine, and, after a massive book tour, would go on to be #1 on The New York Times bestseller list for 55 weeks. Reuben became a celebrity, guesting, a dozen times, on The Tonight Show with Johnny Carson.

As popular as the book was, it attracted critics in both the clinical world, and the public. The LGBT community objected to negative descriptions of homosexuality in the book (for example, Reuben wrote that gay men were "trying to solve the problem with only half the pieces"; lesbianism was relegated to a brief discussion in a section about prostitution). It was negatively reviewed, with "anti-Semitic overtones", by Gore Vidal, in The New York Review of Books, for its homophobia. In 1972, Playboy magazine published an article purporting to expose 100 errors in the book.

Reuben wrote an updated version ("he says he has altered 96 percent of his first edition") which was published 30 years later, in 1999 and 2000. In particular, his views on homosexuality, abortion, and pornography were updated. Andrew Tobias reviewed the book, in 1999, for The Advocate. It was reviewed by the Los Angeles Times, The Baltimore Sun, the Chicago Tribune, and others.

Meme
Its curiosity-arousing title and its question-and-answer format has inspired hundreds of similarly titled and formatted research papers.

Jack Benny's "Everything you always wanted to know about Jack Benny, but were afraid to ask" featured Reuben.

Further reading

References

External links
 "Everything You Always Wanted to Know About Sex", Semantic Scholar

1969 non-fiction books
Sex manuals
Literature related to the sexual revolution
Non-fiction books adapted into films